Franz Hillenkamp (March 18, 1936 – August 22, 2014) was a German scientist known for his development of the laser microprobe mass analyzer and, with Michael Karas, matrix-assisted laser desorption/ionization (MALDI).

Early life and education
Franz Hillenkamp was born in 1936 in Essen, Germany. He attended high school in Lünen, graduating in 1955. He received a M.S. degree in electrical engineering from Purdue University in 1961. He received a Ph.D. (Dr.-Ing.) from the Technische Universität München in 1966 with a thesis entitled “An Absolutely Calibrated Calorimeter for the Measurement of Pulsed Laser Radiation.”

Academic career
Hillenkamp was a professor at Goethe University Frankfurt in Frankfurt from 1982 to 1986. In 1986, he became a professor on the Medical Faculty of the University of Münster where he remained until his retirement in 2001.

Laser microprobe
In 1973, Hillenkamp developed a high performance laser microprobe mass spectrometer with a spatial resolution of 0.5 µm and sub-attogram limit of detection for lithium atoms. This instrument was commercialized as the LAMMA 500 and was one of the first laser desorption mass spectrometers to be used for mass spectrometry imaging of tissue. The later LAMMA 1000 was also based on a Hillenkamp design.

MALDI
In 1985, Hillenkamp and his colleague Michael Karas used a LAMMA 1000 mass spectrometer to demonstrate the technique of matrix-assisted laser desorption/ionization (MALDI). MALDI is an ionization method used in mass spectrometry, allowing the analysis of large biopolymers. Although Karas and Hillenkamp were the first to discover MALDI, Japanese engineer Koichi Tanaka was the first to use a similar method in 1988 to ionize proteins and shared the Nobel Prize in Chemistry in 2002 for that work. Karas and Hillenkamp reported MALDI of proteins a few months later. The MALDI method of Karas and Hillenkamp subsequently became the much more widely used method.

Awards
In 1997, Hillenkamp and Karas were awarded the American Society for Mass Spectrometry Distinguished Contribution in Mass Spectrometry award for their discovery of MALDI. Hillenkamp and Karas received the Karl Heinz Beckurts Award, Germany's most important award for outstanding promotion of the partnership between science and industry, in 2003. Hillenkamp received the Thomson Medal from the International Mass Spectrometry Foundation in 2003.

See also 
 History of mass spectrometry

References

External links
 Franz Hillenkamp on masspec.scripps.edu
 Franz Hillenkamp biography on Munster University website

Mass spectrometrists
Scientists from North Rhine-Westphalia
20th-century German chemists
1936 births
2014 deaths
Thomson Medal recipients
People from Essen